Wittes is a surname. It is the surname of:
Benjamin Wittes (born 1969), American journalist, married to Tamara
Janet Wittes, American statistician, married to Robert
Pam and Jon Wittes, American bridge players, 1986 winners of the World Mixed Pairs Championship
Robert E. Wittes, American physician, married to Janet
Tamara Cofman Wittes, American foreign policy expert, married to Benjamin